John Temple (1518/19 – 1558 or later) was an English politician.

He was a Member (MP) of the Parliament of England for Ripon in April 1554 and for Great Bedwyn in 1558.

References

1510s births
16th-century deaths
English MPs 1554
English MPs 1558
Members of Parliament for Great Bedwyn